Atmaram Raoji Deshpande (1901–8 may 1982) was a Marathi poet from Vidarbha region of Maharashtra, India. He wrote poems under the pen name Anil (अनिल). He was born on 11 September 1901 at Murtijapur in Akola district of Central India. He was married to Kusum Jayawant in 1929; she took the name Kusumavati Deshpande and was also a Marathi writer.

Deshpande introduced free style --Muktachhand (मुक्तछंद)-- poetry to Marathi literature. He also introduced in Marathi Dashapadi (दशपदी), a new genre of sonnets comprising ten lines. His collection of poems with the same name Dashapadi (दशपदी) received a Sahitya Akademi Award in 1977. He was elected for Sahitya Akademi Fellowship in 1979.

He presided over Marathi Sahitya Sammelan (मराठी साहित्य सम्मेलन) at Malvan in 1958.

Deshpande won several international honors. He was a member of the committee of literacy experts of UNESCO. He was leader of Indian delegation of literary experts to USSR. He was awarded UNESCO fellowship for studying social education schemes in various countries.

A collection of letters between Deshpande and his wife was published under the title Kusumanil (कुसुमानिल) in 1976.

Works
The following are the titles of collections of Deshpande's  poems:

 Phulwat (फुलवात) (1932)
 Bhagnamoorti (भग्नमूर्ति) (1940)
 Nirwasit Chini Mulas (निर्वासित चिनी मुलास) (1943)
 Perte Vha (पेर्ते व्हा)(1947)
 Sangati (सांगाती) (1961)
 Dashapadi (दशपदी) (1976)

References

Marathi-language poets
1901 births
1982 deaths
Marathi-language writers
Recipients of the Sahitya Akademi Award in Marathi
Recipients of the Sahitya Akademi Fellowship
People from Akola district
20th-century Indian poets
Indian male poets
Poets from Maharashtra
20th-century Indian male writers
Presidents of the Akhil Bharatiya Marathi Sahitya Sammelan